American football was a demonstration sport at the World Games 2005 at the MSV-Arena in Duisburg, Germany. The semi-finals were held on July 15 and the medal games two days later. The Final was won by host team Germany who beat Sweden 20–6. Bronze medal was won by France, who beat Australia 14–0

It was the first, and until 2017 only American football tournament at the World Games.

Medals table

Participants

Four teams took part in this tournament:

 (host)

Bracket

Details

Semifinal: France vs Sweden

Semifinal: Germany vs Australia

Bronze medal game: France vs Australia

The Final: Sweden vs Germany

See also
American football at the World Games
American football at the 1932 Summer Olympics

References

External links
American football at the 2005 Games
2005 Games results

2005 World Games
2005
World Games
2005 in American football